Hale is a village in the Metropolitan Borough of Trafford, Greater Manchester, England.  The village and the adjacent village of Hale Barns contain 38 listed buildings that are recorded in the National Heritage List for England.  Of these, one is listed at Grade I, the highest of the three grades, two are at Grade II*, the middle grade, and the others are at Grade II, the lowest grade.

Hale was originally a rural area, but with the coming of the railway in 1849, it grew and became a commuter area for Manchester.  The village became the home for Edgar Wood, an architect who designed buildings in the Arts and Crafts style.  The house he designed for himself is listed, together with a number of other houses he designed.  Other similar houses were designed by John N. Cocker, who was influenced by Wood, and these too are listed.  Most of the earlier listed buildings are houses and associated structures, farmhouses, farm buildings, a chapel, and a Sunday school.  The railway station was rebuilt in about 1886, and its platform buildings and footbridge are listed.  The other listed buildings include a church, two war memorials, and an air raid siren.


Key

Buildings

References

Citations

Sources

Lists of listed buildings in Greater Manchester